Thomas William  Waterall (24 October 1884 – 8 November 1951) was an English footballer. He played as an outside left in the Football League and Southern League.

Waterall started his working life as a miner, becoming a professional footballer for the first time in 1906. After spells in the Football League with Notts County, Bradford Park Avenue and Leicester Fosse, Waterall joined Southern League side Watford in July 1914. He did not play any part in Watford's first five fixtures of the 1914–15 season, but was everpresent thereafter, and scored a hat-trick on his second appearance for the club, in a 3–0 away win against Millwall. Watford went on to win the Southern League that season. After the resumption of peacetime football following the First World War, he spent two furthers seasons as a regular in the team. He was a part of the side that finished second in the Southern League on goal average in 1919–20, and the following season Waterall played in Watford's first ever Football League fixture, a 2–1 away win at Queens Park Rangers on 28 August 1920. At the end of the 1920–21 season, Waterall joined Gillingham on a free transfer.

Two of his brothers, Albert and Ike were professional footballers; both started their careers at Notts County. Albert later played for Stockport County and Ike for Millwall.

References

1884 births
1951 deaths
Footballers from Nottingham
English footballers
Notts County F.C. players
Bradford (Park Avenue) A.F.C. players
Mansfield Mechanics F.C. players
Leicester City F.C. players
Watford F.C. players
Gillingham F.C. players
Sheppey United F.C. players
Sittingbourne F.C. players
English Football League players
Southern Football League players
Stockport County F.C. wartime guest players
Association football wingers